Thomas Reginald Hallett (born 10 April 1939) is a Welsh former professional football player and coach.

Career
Born in Glynneath, Hallett was a Welsh schoolboy international, and began his career with Leeds United. He turned professional in 1956 but made only one first-team appearance, in a League Cup game in 1962. He moved to Swindon Town in 1963, making 26 appearances in the English Football League over three seasons. His final team was Bradford City, where he made 179 league appearances, before retiring in 1971. In 1968, he also served as joint caretaker manager of Bradford City, alongside Jim McAnearney, following the death of Grenville Hair.

References

1939 births
Living people
Welsh footballers
Welsh football managers
English Football League players
Leeds United F.C. players
Swindon Town F.C. players
Bradford City A.F.C. players
Bradford City A.F.C. managers
Association football central defenders